This is a list of episodes of the television series Bob Hope Presents the Chrysler Theatre (1963–1967).  Bob Hope Presents the Chrysler Theatre aired on NBC Fridays at 8:30–9:30 pm (EST) for the first two seasons, before moving to Wednesdays at 9:00-10:00 pm (EST) during seasons 3 and 4.  Some variety specials and comedic presentations (almost all starring Hope or Bing Crosby) were aired under the modified title "Chrysler presents A Bob Hope Comedy Special", or similar variations thereof.  These are listed separately as specials.  Some sources consider these episodes as part of the regular series; many do not.

Several episodes of this series were rerun from 1968 through 1972 under several different titles: NBC Adventure Theatre (1971–1972), NBC Action Playhouse (1971–1972), NBC Comedy Playhouse (1968–1970) and NBC Comedy Theater (1971–1972). The Hope introductions were replaced by other hosts, such as Peter Marshall (who hosted "Action"), Art Fleming ("Adventure" in 1971), Ed McMahon ("Adventure" in 1972), Monty Hall ("Comedy Playhouse" in 1968) and Jack Kelly ("Comedy Playhouse" in 1970, and "Comedy Theater").

In syndication, the series was presented as Universal Star Time and Theatre of the Stars, minus Hope's opening and closing segments.

Series overview

Episodes

Season 1 (1963-64)
The show picked up eight Emmy nominations in its first season, winning three.  The season overall was nominated for Outstanding Program Achievement in the Field of Drama.  Other awards and nominations are listed within individual episode write-ups.

</onlyinclude>

Season 2 (1964–65)
Though no individual episode or performance was nominated for an Emmy during season 2, the season did receive an overall Emmy nomination, for Outstanding Program Achievement in Entertainment.

Season 3 (1965–66)
The series received six Emmy nominations during season 3, winning four.  Nominations and awards are identified in the episode write-ups below.

Bob Hope Presents the Chrysler Theatre
Bob Hope
Bob Hope Presents the Chrysler Theatre